Charles Henry Wilson, 1st Baron Nunburnholme (22 April 1833 – 21 October 1907), was a prominent English shipowner who became head of the Thomas Wilson Sons & Co. shipping business.

Together with his brother he expanded the activities of the company, into one of the largest in Britain. He also served as Liberal MP for Hull for thirty years, and in 1906 received the title Baron Nunburnholme.

Life 
 
Charles was the eldest son of Thomas Wilson, the head of Thomas Wilson Sons & Co., a Hull shipping company founded in the Swedish ore trade. He was educated at Kingston College in Hull, along with his brother Arthur, before eventually joining the family business, where they both became joint managers in 1867.

Under the brother's management the shipping company rapidly expanded adding Adriatic, Sicilian, American and Indian services to the pre-existing Norwegian and Baltic trade. In 1891 the company became a private limited company, with capital of £2.5 million, and expanded with the acquisition of Bailey and Leetham (Hull) in 1903; and the shipping interests of the North Eastern Railway in 1908. Wilson was also became chairman of Earle's Shipbuilding, the United Shipping Company and the Hull Steam Fish and Ice Company.

Wilson served as high sheriff of Hull, and from 1874 to 1905 he was Liberal Member of Parliament (MP) for the Hull constituency, from 1885 representing Hull West. Although opposed to the Boer War, he lent the company's finest vessel, Ariosto, at the government's disposal.

He was given the Freedom of the City of Hull in 1899, and in 1906 he was raised to the peerage as Baron Nunburnholme, of the City of Kingston upon Hull.

Lord Nunburnholme died at his residence, Warter Priory, Warter, Pocklington, East Riding of Yorkshire, on 21 October 1907 and was buried on 31 October. His eldest son Charles, who had succeeded him as MP for Hull West, inherited the Barony.

Family 
Wilson married Florence Jane Helen Wellesley (1853–1932), a daughter of Col. William Henry Charles Wellesley, nephew of Arthur Wellesley, 1st Duke of Wellington. They had seven children.

Issue

References

Sources

 ; online edn., May 2006

External links 

 

1833 births
1907 deaths
Wilson, Charles
Barons in the Peerage of the United Kingdom
Wilson, Charles
Wilson, Charles
Wilson, Charles
Wilson, Charles
Wilson, Charles
Wilson, Charles
Wilson, Charles
Wilson, Charles
British businesspeople in shipping
Businesspeople from Kingston upon Hull
Peers created by Edward VII
19th-century English businesspeople